Ben Hamilton Johnston (born 25 April 1980) is a drummer, vocalist, and songwriter, best known for his work with Scottish group Biffy Clyro.

Early life
Johnston was born and raised in Kilmarnock with his twin brother James Johnston (who would go on to be the bassist for Biffy Clyro), and his younger brother, Adam (who used to be Biffy Clyro's drum tech).

Career

Biffy Clyro

Having previously played drums with schoolfriend Simon Neil and brother James Johnston in a band called Skrewfish in 1995, Simon moved to Glasgow whilst Ben and James stayed in Ayrshire. They were soon discovered by manager Dee Bahl and then signed to Beggars Banquet in 2001.

Marmaduke Duke

Johnston plays drums when the conceptual rock duo Marmaduke Duke plays live.

Other

When Ben was in College he fronted a Rage Against the Machine tribute band Raj Against The Shereen as revealed in an interview with Biffy Clyro at Reading Festival where they (Biffy Clyro) performed a cover version of the song "Killing in the Name".

Personal life

Ben is married to Louise Johnston and they live together in Ayrshire with their son Ross. He is an avid fan of Scottish football club Kilmarnock. In January 2011 was asked by the club to take part in the half time 'Cross Bar Challenge'. He scored on Soccer AM whilst sporting a Kilmarnock F.C. strip. Ben also took part in Kilmarnock F.C.'s pre season open day football match, alongside James and Simon, with Ben kicking off the match.

Musical equipment used
The following is a list of musical equipment used by Ben Johnston.

Cymbals
 Ben Johnston is endorsed by Sabian (According to ).
  6" AAX Splash
  8" AA China Splash
 14" Legacy Hi-Hats
 17" AAX X-Plosion Crash
 18" AAX X-Plosion Crash
 18" AAX X-Plosion China
 19" AAX X-Plosion Crash
 19" Paragon Chinese
 21" HHX Raw Bell Dry Ride

Drums
Johnston is also endorsed by Pearl.
 Pearl Reference Kit colour:Rootbear Fade
 Pearl Chad Smith Signature 14x5.5 Snare
 22x18" Bass drum, 12x9" Rack tom, 14x14" and 16x16" floor toms
 Pearl Eliminator Double Bass Pedal

Biffy's Tour Manager Neil told fans on the BC forum that Ben is now using a 'Pearl Eric Singer Signature Snare Drum' and is waiting for a new totally custom Pearl Masters Kit

New Kit

Pearl Masters Colour :Black

22x18" Bass drum, 12x8" Rack tom, 14x14" and 16x16" floor toms
 Pearl Eliminator Double Bass Pedal

Drum Heads:
Bass Drum: BATTER: Aquarian coated superkick 2 RESONANT: Coated Pearl Masters Pro Tone
Snare: BATTER: Aquarian coated Hi-Energy RESONANT: Hi-Performance Snare Bottom
Rack tom, first floor and second floor: BATTER: Remo Pinstripes RESONANT: Remo Ambassador

Other
The Neil Peart signature series drumstick
Angel AX25K Glockenspiel
Fender CD-140SCE Can Be Seen Hanging on His Wall in the Live Lounge Videos
Johnston also plays a customised Cajon when Biffy Clyro are playing acoustically.

Notes

Scottish drummers
British male drummers
Scottish rock drummers
People from Kilmarnock
Alumni of Stow College
Living people
1980 births
Identical twins
Biffy Clyro members
Scottish twins
21st-century drummers
Twin musicians